Njata is a small town in Malawi.

Populated places in Malawi